Hao Junmin (born 24 March 1987) is a Chinese professional footballer who plays for Chinese Super League club Guangzhou F.C. and the China national team.

Club career
Hao Junmin started his football career with Tianjin Teda when he made his debut for the club on 15 September 2004 in a 2–0 win against Liaoning Zhongyu. This was then followed by his first goal for the club on 28 November 2004 in a 5–1 win against Liaoning Zhongyu. He would establish himself as a regular for the club and aided them to a fourth-place finish in the 2005 season. This saw not only his importance towards the team but the following seasons would see him personally rise towards predominance when he would win the Chinese Football Association Young Player of the Year award in both 2006 and 2007. His talent would then start to shine when he aided Tianjin to finish high enough for them to qualify for the club's first ever AFC Champions League campaign during the 2008 season.

On 22 January 2010, Hao left Tianjin Teda to sign with Bundesliga side Schalke 04. He made his debut for the club on 6 March 2010 in a 4–1 win against Eintracht Frankfurt, becoming the first Chinese footballer to ever play for Schalke 04.
He was originally given the shirt number 7, but was asked to surrender it when Raúl was signed on 28 July 2010. Hao, being a longtime fan of the legendary Spanish striker, happily obliged and received the number 8 shirt instead.

On 8 July 2011, Hao transferred to Chinese Super League side Shandong Luneng even though he still had one year remaining on his contract with Schalke 04. Hao suffered an injury during preseason training and was out for the majority of the 2013 season. He made his first appearance of the season back from injury on 10 August 2013 in a 3–2 win against Shanghai Shenhua.

On 25 July 2021, Hao joined hometown club Wuhan F.C. on a free transfer.

International career
Hao worked his way up by first playing for the China under-17 national team in the 2003 FIFA U-17 World Championship and then progressed to the China under-20 national team that took part in 2005 FIFA World Youth Championship. His performances were good enough for him to join the national team to play in the 2005 East Asian Cup where he made his debut on 3 August 2005 in a 2–2 draw against Japan. Under then manager Zhu Guanghu, his international career would flourish; however, he was not called up for the 2007 AFC Asian Cup due to illness. In 2008, Hao was eligible to play for the 2008 Summer Olympics squad where he started two of the three group games in the tournament.

Career statistics

Club

International

Scores and results list China's goal tally first, score column indicates score after each Hao goal.

Honours
Schalke 04
DFB-Pokal: 2010-11

Shandong Luneng
Chinese FA Cup: 2014, 2020
Chinese FA Super Cup: 2015

China
East Asian Football Championship: 2005

Individual
Chinese Football Association Young Player of the Year: 2005, 2007
Chinese Super League Team of the Year: 2005, 2007, 2017, 2019

Notes

References

External links
 
 
 Hao Junmin at Sohu.com
 
 
 
 
 
 

1987 births
Living people
Footballers from Wuhan
Association football midfielders
Association football forwards
Chinese footballers
Olympic footballers of China
China international footballers
Footballers at the 2006 Asian Games
Footballers at the 2008 Summer Olympics
2011 AFC Asian Cup players
2015 AFC Asian Cup players
2019 AFC Asian Cup players
Chinese expatriate footballers
Tianjin Jinmen Tiger F.C. players
FC Schalke 04 players
Shandong Taishan F.C. players
Chinese Super League players
Bundesliga players
Expatriate footballers in Germany
Chinese expatriate sportspeople in Germany
Asian Games competitors for China